Robert Lindsay Greenwood Jr. (born March 2, 1987 in Prattville, Alabama) is a former American football offensive tackle for the Kansas City Chiefs of the National Football League. He was signed by the Chiefs as an undrafted free agent in 2009. He played college football at Alabama.

At Alabama, Greenwood was a solid contributor on defense for all four seasons. In 2005, he was named to the 2005 All-SEC Freshman Team. Against Auburn in 2008, he blocked a field goal attempt to preserve a 10–0 Crimson Tide lead at the half. The Tide would go on to win 36-0.

External links
Alabama Crimson Tide bio
Kansas City Chiefs bio

1987 births
Living people
People from Prattville, Alabama
Players of American football from Alabama
American football defensive ends
Alabama Crimson Tide football players
Kansas City Chiefs players